Hans Jacobsen (26 December 1872 – 1943) was a Danish trade unionist.

Born in Aarhus, Jacobsen completed an apprenticeship as a tailor, and worked in Norway, Germany and Switzerland, before returning to Aarhus. There, he joined a local union of tailors.  In 1905, he was elected as the union's president, and then in 1914 he became the full-time secretary of the national tailors' federation.

In 1919, Jacobsen began working full-time for the Danish Confederation of Trade Unions, becoming a vice president in 1928 then, in 1929, its treasurer.  In 1928, he became a vice president of the International Federation of Trade Unions, and also served on its executive.

Jacobsen retired from all his union positions in 1940 and died three years later.

References

1872 births
1943 deaths
Danish trade union leaders
People from Aarhus